The 2005–06 Villanova Wildcats men's basketball team represented Villanova University in the 2005–06 college basketball season. This team is typically credited with re-establishing Villanova as a national powerhouse after nearly two decades of underwhelming performances.

Villanova, led by head coach Jay Wright, spent most of the season competing with Duke and Big East rival Connecticut for possession of the top spot in the college basketball rankings. Utilizing a starting lineup that consisted of four guards (seniors Randy Foye and Allan Ray, junior Mike Nardi, and sophomore Kyle Lowry) and a center (junior Will Sheridan), Villanova played a fast-paced style of basketball that became a common topic of intrigue among analysts. Villanova entered the NCAA tournament as a number one seed and made an Elite Eight appearance before losing to eventual champion Florida.

Four players from the 2005-06 Villanova Wildcat team currently have played in the NBA: Randy Foye, Allan Ray, Kyle Lowry, and Dante Cunningham. As of 2022, only Kyle Lowry remains in the NBA.

Class of 2005 

|-
| colspan="7" style="padding-left:10px;" | Overall Recruiting Rankings:     Scout – NR     Rivals – NR      ESPN –
|}

Roster

Coaching staff 
Jay Wright – Head Coach

Schedule

Awards and honors 
 Randy Foye, Consensus first-team All-American
 Allan Ray, Consensus second-team All-American
 Randy Foye, Big East Player of the Year
 Randy Foye, First-team All-Big East
 Allan Ray, First-team All-Big East
 Kyle Lowry, Second-team All-Big East
 Randy Foye, Robert V. Geasey Trophy

References 

Villanova Wildcats
Villanova Wildcats men's basketball seasons
Villanova
Villanova Wildcats men's b
Villanova Wildcats men's b